Samuel or Sam Young may refer to:

Samuel Baldwin Marks Young (1840–1924), United States Army general
Samuel H. Young (1922–2017), United States Representative from Illinois
Samuel Young (General Superintendent) (1901–1990), from the Church of the Nazarene and Eastern Nazarene College
Sam Young (English cricketer) (born 2000), English cricketer
Samuel Young (Jamaican cricketer) (born 1902), Jamaican cricketer
Samuel Young (Irish politician) (1822–1918), oldest ever member of the UK House of Commons
Samuel Young (New York politician) (1779–1850), New York state politician
Samuel Young (footballer) (1883–1954), Irish footballer
Sam Young (American football) (born 1987), American football offensive tackle
Sam Young (basketball) (born 1985), American basketball player
Sam Young (Neighbours), a fictional character from the Australian soap opera Neighbours

See also
Sammy Younge Jr. (1944-1966), murdered civil rights and voting rights activist
Samuel Youngs (1760–1839), New York assemblyman from Westchester County, inspiration for The Legend of Sleepy Hollow
Samuel Youngs (1753–1797), New York assemblyman from Queens County 1794